Schizo may refer to:

Films 
 Schizo (1976 film), a 1976 horror film
 The Psychopath or Schizo, a 1966 British horror film

Other uses 
 a slur towards those suffering from schizophrenia
 Schizo, a mixtape by American rapper Dreezy
 Schizo, a series of cartoons by Ivan Brunetti

See also 
 The Schizo's, a Dutch punk rock band
 Crazyhouse, a form of chess also known as schizo-chess
 Schizophrenia (disambiguation)